Yeşiltepe is a village in the Çelikhan District, Adıyaman Province, Turkey. Its population was 420 in 2021.

References

Villages in Çelikhan District
Kurdish settlements in Adıyaman Province